George Stoddard Whitney (March 2, 1878 – May 5, 1956) was an American college football player and coach. He served as the head football coach at Union College in 1902, at Sewanee: The University of the South from 1903 to 1904, and at North Carolina College of Agriculture and Mechanic Arts—North Carolina State University—in 1905, and at the University of Georgia from 1906 to 1907, compiling a career college football record of 33–19–3. Whitney played football as a tackle at Cornell University.  He died at his home in Schenectady, New York on May 5, 1956.

Head coaching record

References

External links
 

1878 births
1956 deaths
American football tackles
Cornell Big Red football players
Georgia Bulldogs football coaches
NC State Wolfpack football coaches
Sewanee Tigers football coaches
Union Dutchmen football coaches
Sportspeople from Binghamton, New York